Porto Editora is the largest Portuguese publisher with a consolidated turnover of more than 90M € in 2010.  It is
the leading educational publisher in Portugal  in the areas of educational books, dictionaries and multimedia products, both off-line and on-line. Porto Editora was founded in 1944 in Porto by a group of teachers within different areas of education.

Since its involvement in Multimedia in 1994, Porto Editora has published dozens of educational CD-ROMs and DVD-ROMs, several of which, such as “Diciopédia”, have become well-known, best-selling multimedia products in Portugal. 	 
  	  	  	  	 
At the same time, Porto Editora has been developing a project for the internet aimed at a range of different users: students of all ages, parents and teachers. For children between the ages of 5–12: http://www.sitiodosmiudos.pt for learning the first numbers, letters and words, while taking the first steps in the internet; http://www.edusurfa.pt is a teen site with topics such as cinema, theater, music or books as well as school subjects; for parents, teachers and the whole educational community, http://www.educare.pt offers a full news coverage of the Portuguese educational reality, and also articles, files and reports by some of the most well-known personalities in pedagogy, psychology, pediatrics, and other education-related areas.

On e-commerce, http://www.wook.pt is a successful project implemented by Porto Editora. Here can be found all the books, multimedia products and video games published and released in Portugal, along with English, French and Spanish books, which amounts to 6 million books available for immediate or short delivery. Wook.pt, with its 500.000 registered clients, has been distinguished frequently with prizes and positively mentioned in the media.

Book series
 Colecção Bolso Infantil
 Colecção Mundo de Saberes
 Colecção Portuguesa
 Dicionários académicos

References

External links
Porto Editora
Wook
Educare
Edusurfa
Diciopédia
Infopédia
Escola Virtual

Bookstores of Portugal
Book publishing companies of Portugal
Companies based in Porto